Narrow-snouted pipefish (Syngnathus tenuirostris) is a pipefish species which inhabits the Mediterranean basin: Adriatic Sea, Tyrrhenian Sea, and Black Sea. It is a marine demersal fish with an ovoviviparous breeding pattern.

References

Fish of the Sea of Azov
Fish of the Adriatic Sea
Fish of the Mediterranean Sea
Fish of the Black Sea
Fish of Europe
Fish described in 1837
Syngnathus